Two members of the Tellurite-Resistance/Dicarboxylate Transporter (TDT) family have been functionally characterised. One is the TehA protein of Escherichia coli which has been implicated in resistance to tellurite; the other is the Mae1 protein of Schizosaccharomyces pombe which functions in the uptake of malate and other dicarboxylates by a proton symport mechanism. These proteins have 10 putative transmembrane helices.

References

Protein families
Transmembrane transporters